I Indian Brigade, Royal Horse Artillery was a brigade of the Royal Horse Artillery formed at the outbreak of World War I.  It served with 1st Indian Cavalry Division on the Western Front.  It was redesignated XVI Brigade, RHA in February 1917 and XVI Army Brigade, RHA in March 1918.  It was disbanded after the war.

History

I Indian Brigade, RHA
I Indian Brigade, RHA was formed on 12 December 1914 for the 1st Indian Cavalry Division in France.  It commanded
 A Battery of I Brigade, RHA at Ambala, India
 Q Battery of VIII Brigade, RHA at Peshawar, India
 U Battery of XI Brigade, RHA at Lucknow, India
 I Indian RHA Brigade Ammunition Column
Each battery was armed with six 13 pounder guns.

The brigade served with the 1st Indian Cavalry Division on the Western Front and the brigade commander acted as Commander Royal Horse Artillery (CRHA).  In practice, the batteries were permanently assigned to the cavalry brigades, viz:
 A Battery with 3rd (Ambala) Cavalry Brigade then 5th (Mhow) Cavalry Brigade from 15 September 1915 when it arrived from 2nd Indian Cavalry Division
 Q Battery with 2nd (Sialkot) Cavalry Brigade
 U Battery with 8th (Lucknow) Cavalry Brigade
Other than the Battle of Cambrai when it helped to told the German counter-attack, the division was not involved in battle. Instead, it was held in reserve in case of a breakthrough, although it did send parties to the trenches on a number of occasions. They would hold the line, or act as Pioneers; such parties were designated as, for example, the Mhow Battalion.

XVI Brigade, RHA
On 26 November 1916, 1st Indian Cavalry Division was renamed 4th Cavalry Division.  Consequently, on 24 February 1917, the brigade was redesignated as XVI Brigade, RHA.

In March 1918, the 4th Cavalry Division was broken up in France. The British units remained in France and the Indian elements were sent to Egypt to help constitute 1st Mounted Division.  The brigade became XVI Army Brigade, RHA.  About this time the brigade's 13 pounders were replaced by 18 pounders.  At the Armistice, it was serving as Army Troops with the Fourth Army commanding A, Q, and U Batteries, RHA (eighteen 18 pounders).  The brigade moved to Germany as part of the Army of Occupation.

Dissolved
The brigade was broken up in Germany in April 1919 and the batteries returned to England.  A Battery joined I Brigade, RHA at Woolwich, Q Battery joined VII Brigade, RHA at Exeter and U Battery joined IX Brigade, RHA at Trowbridge.

See also

Notes

References

Bibliography

External links
1st Indian Cavalry Division on The Long, Long Trail
1st Indian Cavalry Division on the Regimental Warpath

Royal Horse Artillery brigades
Artillery units and formations of World War I
Military units and formations established in 1914
Military units and formations disestablished in 1919